The West Yorkshire derbies are a series of football matches or rugby league matches taking place between football or rugby league clubs from West Yorkshire.

In football

History

Leeds United's relegation to League One in 2007 may have reignited this rivalry, although Bradford's relegation to League Two removed the possibility that the three major West Yorkshire football teams (Bradford, Huddersfield and Leeds) might be in the same division for the first time since the 1980s in the 2007–08 season; ultimately only Huddersfield and Leeds met each other in the third tier. In the 2010–11 and 2011–12 seasons all three teams involved in the West Yorkshire Derby were in different leagues, Bradford City were in League Two, Huddersfield Town were in League One and Leeds United played in the Championship. At the end of the 2011–12 season, Huddersfield were promoted from League One to the Championship, rekindling the rivalry with Leeds. In 2016–17 Huddersfield were promoted to the Premier League, making the rivalry go into hiatus again. Huddersfield were relegated at the end of the 2018–19 season and Leeds completed the double over their local rivals in the 2019–20 EFL Championship season on their way to winning promotion back to the Premier League after a 16 year absence.

Bradford City and Leeds United

Bradford engage in a very fierce competition with local rivals Leeds United: they are considered to be the club's most hated rivals in modern times.

This rivalry is mainly due to the two cities' proximity to one another, which has exacerbated in later years because there has been some football fans within Bradford choosing to travel the short distance to support Leeds rather than the home town's City. Although Leeds fans are unlikely to raise the same level of emotion talking about Bradford that a City fan would in talking about Leeds. There may be other reasons, including the setting alight of a chip van by Leeds fans during a game between the two sides at Odsal perceived by some as a mockery of the Bradford City stadium fire.

The last meeting between these two sides was at Valley Parade on 27 August 2014 in the Football League Cup, Leeds took a 1–0 lead in the 82nd minute, but Bradford won the game with goals from Billy Knott and James Hanson.

Head-to-head record (including Leeds City)

Current as of 27 August 2014. Statistics obtained from Soccerbase.

Bradford City and Huddersfield Town

Bradford City and Huddersfield Town have had roughly the same league status for the last couple of decades and so it could be argued that they are closest rivals out of the three West Yorkshire teams.

Matches against these sides have produced both amazing spectacles and some terrible moments—the 1996–97 season providing examples of both. On 1 February 1997, Huddersfield Town defender Kevin Gray broke the leg of Bradford City striker Gordon Watson in two places with a horrific sliding tackle. Watson was, at that time, the most expensive player in Bradford City's history having cost them £575,000, and was playing in only his third match for the club. He required a six-inch plate and seven screws in his leg. It took Gordon almost two years of recovery and five further operations before he was able to return to football, after which he made just a handful of appearances for City before leaving the club. At Leeds High Court in October 1998 he succeeded in becoming only the second player in the history of football to prove negligence by another player and was later awarded in excess of £900,000 in damages, making it "the most expensive tackle in British football and legal history".

The return fixture that season was a happier affair. It provided a spectacular display of goals in which City took a 3–0 lead, including one famous goal scored directly from a corner by ex-England star Chris Waddle, before the game swung in Huddersfield's favour as they fought back to the final score of 3–3.

The most recent derby with Huddersfield Town at the John Smith's Stadium ended in a 2–1 victory for the home team in the first round of the Capital One Cup on 6 August 2013.

Head-to-head record

Current as of 21 March 2021. Statistics obtained from Soccerbase.

Leeds United and Huddersfield Town

Leeds United's best period of success was in the 1960s, and 1970s under the management of the legendary Don Revie. Between 1963 and 1975, Leeds became feared and respected across the country and in Europe. Revie guided them to two league championships, a FA Cup, one League Cup, two Inter-Cities Fairs Cups and a Charity Shield. Despite the success, Leeds had some notable disappointments, they were runners-up five times in the league, FA Cup finalists three times and UEFA Cup Winners Cup and European Cup finalists once. In 1992, Howard Wilkinson guided Leeds to their third top flight title, just two years after getting them promoted from the old Second Division, where they had played for eight years. Leeds also had sustained success in the Premier League, between 1997 and 2002 the club never finished outside of the top five and reached the UEFA Cup and Champions League semi-finals. However Leeds' success during this latter period came at a huge cost with tens of millions of pounds spent gambling on sustained Champions League involvement. When Leeds could only finish 5th in the 2001–02 season the clubs debt were around £80 million and a number of highly paid stars had to be sold to reduce the debt. By the end of the 2003–04 Premier League season, Leeds were relegated after 14 years in the top flight and three years later were relegated to League One and spent three years in the third tier before returning to the Championship at the end of the 2009–10 season. Leeds returned to the top flight in the 2020–21 season for the first time since 2004. 

Huddersfield Town were the first team in English football to win the First Division title three times in a row back in the 1920s – a feat only matched by Liverpool, Manchester United and Arsenal – they also claimed the FA Cup, Charity Shield and finished as runners-up in the league three times in this period. Huddersfield spent 45 years outside of the top flight between 1972 and 2017. The Terriers had numerous promotions and relegations between the second, third and fourth tiers of English football. However, under their new manager David Wagner, Huddersfield won promotion to the Premier League for the first time by defeating Reading in the 2017 Championship play-off final.

Head-to-head record (including Leeds City)

Current as of 1 January 2020. Statistics obtained from Soccerbase.

Other rivalries
Bradford City historically have a fierce rivalry with other Bradfordian team Bradford (Park Avenue) A.F.C., which can also be considered a "West Yorkshire derby", however this is rivalry is commonly known as the "Bradford derby". Park Avenue were formerly an English Football League team until 1970.

FC Halifax Town, another West Yorkshire football team playing in the National League, consider Huddersfield Town to be one of their main rivals. They have played against each other when their predecessor, Halifax Town A.F.C., was in the Football League.

Farsley Celtic has a 'one-way' rivalry with Leeds United. They are based in the Leeds Metropolitan district however they have never reached the Football League.

In the Northern Premier League, matches between Liversedge and Ossett United are regularly played on a Friday night, and attract crowds of more than 1000, which is very high for this level of football.

In rugby league

Rugby league is also big in West Yorkshire. The teams who are, or have been, in the Super League are; Bradford Bulls, Castleford Tigers, Halifax, Huddersfield Giants, Leeds Rhinos, and Wakefield Trinity. Other rugby league clubs in West Yorkshire are Batley Bulldogs, Dewsbury Rams, Featherstone Rovers, Hunslet Hawks and Keighley Cougars. Like football, the most commonly termed  West Yorkshire derby is between Leeds and Bradford, however any combination of West Yorkshire teams playing against each other could be called a West Yorkshire derby, even if the rivalry is not as great as other rivalries between teams in the area. Specific named derbies include the Calder Derby better Castleford and Wakefield, and the Heavy Woollen Derby between Batley and Dewsbury. In addition, the Leeds versus Wakefield rivalry also sees them compete in the Festive Challenge. Castleford verses Leeds has also become a more prominent derby in recent times.

Bradford Bulls and Leeds Rhinos

Head-to-head record
Statistics correct as of 9 April 2021

In all competitions, competitive and uncompetitive:

Meetings in major finals
1946–47 Challenge Cup Final: Bradford 8–4 Leeds
2000 Challenge Cup Final: Bradford 24-18 Leeds

2003 Challenge Cup Final: Bradford 22–20 Leeds
2004 Super League Grand Final: Leeds 26–8 Bradford
2005 Super League Grand Final: Bradford 15–6 Leeds

Collective Honours

Leeds Rhinos and Wakefield Trinity

Castleford Tigers and Wakefield Trinity

Head-to-head record
Statistics correct as of 23 August 2021

In all competitions, competitive and uncompetitive:

Meetings in major finals
1990–91 Yorkshire Cup Final: Castleford 11–8 Wakefield

Collective Honours

Castleford Tigers and Leeds Rhinos

Head-to-head record
Statistics correct as of 19 May 2021

In all competitions, competitive and uncompetitive:

Meetings in major finals
1968–69 Yorkshire Cup Final: Leeds 22–11 Castleford
1988–89 Yorkshire Cup Final: Leeds 32–12 Castleford
2014 Challenge Cup Final: Leeds 23–10 Castleford
2017 Super League Grand Final: Leeds 24–6 Castleford

Collective Honours

Huddersfield Giants and Leeds Rhinos

Head-to-head record
Statistics correct as of 5 November 2021

In all competitions, competitive and uncompetitive:

Meetings in major finals
1914–15 NRFU Grand Final: Huddersfield 35–2 Leeds
1919–20 Yorkshire Cup Final: Huddersfield 25–5 Leeds
1928–29 NRFL Grand Final: Huddersfield 2–0 Leeds
1929–30 NRFL Grand Final: Huddersfield 10–2 Leeds
1930–31 Yorkshire Cup Final: Leeds 10–2 Huddersfield
1937–38 Yorkshire Cup Final: Leeds 14–8 Huddersfield

Collective Honours

Other rivalries
In addition to the major rivalries listed above:

Leeds Rhinos share a fairly one-way rivalry with League 1 and fellow Leeds based side Hunslet. The lack of competitive fixtures sees Rhinos supporters view other West Yorkshire teams as greater rivals.

Similarly, Castleford and Wakefield both share a rivalry with Featherstone Rovers, but seen as Rovers have played most of their recent years in the Championship competitive fixtures are few and far between.

The Heavy Woollen Derby is contested by Championship sides Batley Bulldogs and Dewsbury Rams. This derby generally receives less attention that other West Yorkshire derbies due to it not taking place in the top tier of British rugby league.

Due to their proximity to East Lancashire, roses rivalries see Halifax Panthers and Huddersfield Giants view Oldham Roughyeds and Rochdale Hornets as greater rivals. This has a higher presence in rugby than football partly due to historic roses competition and the limited popularity of rugby league outside of the two historic counties.

See also
 List of sports rivalries in the United Kingdom
 List of association football rivalries in the United Kingdom
 Derbies in the Rugby Football League
 Bradford derby

References

Sports rivalries in the United Kingdom
England football derbies
Football in West Yorkshire
Bradford City A.F.C.
Huddersfield Town A.F.C.
Leeds United F.C.
Halifax Town A.F.C.
Rugby league rivalries
Rugby league in the United Kingdom
Rugby league in Yorkshire
Bradford Bulls
Huddersfield Giants
Leeds Rhinos
Wakefield Trinity
Castleford Tigers